Vladimir Bakulin (3 September 1939 – 10 December 2012) was a Kazakhstani wrestler who competed in the 1968 Summer Olympics.

References

1939 births
2012 deaths
Olympic wrestlers of the Soviet Union
Wrestlers at the 1968 Summer Olympics
Kazakhstani male sport wrestlers
Olympic silver medalists for the Soviet Union
Olympic medalists in wrestling
World Wrestling Championships medalists
Medalists at the 1968 Summer Olympics
20th-century Kazakhstani people